Casa Blanca  is a house located at Segudet, Ordino Parish, Andorra. It is a heritage property registered in the Cultural Heritage of Andorra.

References

Ordino
Houses in Andorra
Cultural Heritage of Andorra